Leptospira borgpetersenii is a pathogenic species of Leptospira.

References

External links
Type strain of Leptospira borgpetersenii at BacDive -  the Bacterial Diversity Metadatabase

borgpetersenii
Bacteria described in 1987